Cultural y Deportiva Leonesa "B" Júpiter Leonés, also known as Júpiter Leonés, is a Spanish football team based in León, in the autonomous community of Castile and León.

Founded in 1929 and re-founded in 2014, it is the reserve team of Cultural y Deportiva Leonesa.

History

Origins 
Cultural y Deportiva Leonesa B was born from the team Jupiter Leonés, founded in 1929 and originally wearing red or claret t-shirt and black pants. Between 1929 and 1936, Júpiter was not registered in the Regional Federation and only played friendly matches. It did not have its own stadium, so it played in different pitches depending on its availability.

With the disappearance of Cultural Leonesa, in the years of the Spanish Second Republic and the difficulties during the Spanish Civil War, Júpiter became the first team in the city of León, over the other main team of the city in the 1930s, the Deportivo Leonés. During this period, the club won 98 of the 117 games that it played, scoring 498 goals.

First contacts with the Cultural 
Júpiter registered in the Federation for the first time in 1952 and it started playing official matches in the second provincial league. As the club was achieving great success, president Antonio Amilivia began the first contacts to merge Júpiter and Deportivo. In 1954 the presidents of both teams, Antonio Amilivia and Demetrio Villalón (that in the 1960s would be president of Cultural Leonesa) signed the first agreement of affiliation. Since its signature, Júpiter changed its colors to white, reaching Tercera División while Cultural Leonesa, as the main team of the city, was playing in Segunda División with a one-year presence in La Liga.

Separation and golden age 
With the descent to Tercera de la Cultural in 1958 the agreement broke down and during the 60s they became legally different clubs, although for all the soccer people the union continued. The loan of players was constant and the fans of both clubs were the same, there was no rivalry, Jupiter was still "the little brother" and all the people in Leon understood it as well. The 1960s can be considered the "golden age" of Jupiter. The club was in Third Division (a Third equivalent to the second B of today but harder) with a strong economy and a good policy of quarry that took advantage of the jewels that the modest clubs of the city removed from its rows. At the head of Jupiter was Agustín Álvarez "Cachús" who was always linked to the Culture but without giving up the best for his Jupiter, trying even in the middle of the decade (in the time of Operation Scrap) to convert Jupiter in the First team of the city to the detriment of the Cultural.

Definite union with the Cultural 

In these 60's Cultural and Jupiter were at the same time being Next to the Ponferradina the "gallitos" of our group of Third. In 1970 with Ángel Panero to the front of the Cultural in Second Division contacts were resumed to reconvert to Jupiter in filial, condition that will have until 1974 when it happens to belong of form officially to the structure of the club, happening to call "Cultural Promesas".

During these years 60 and 70 Cultural and Jupiter were united even in the smallest details; There were card modalities to be members of both clubs, discounts, games that were played in a row, training and preseason joint and what they liked most in the hobby: it was usual for the Cultural to coincide outside the home the day that Jupiter did As local, so that both parties were put at the same time so that, while the fans saw the Jupiter, they would listen by the radio the party of the Cultural.

It is worth noting that in the 1985/86 season the Cultural and Cultural de León play in the third division. The subsidiary makes an exceptional campaign under the orders of Arlindo Cuesta. Winning the majors in the go 2-0 and tying in the return with a few steps to overflow. The lineup of Carlos, Pin, Tobi, Roberto, Paquito, Raúl, Cacharrón, Javi, Losada, Canseco and Pachi will be remembered.

Refounding Júpiter 
After the season 2009–10, the reserve team was dissolved as Cultural Leonesa was relegated to Tercera División due to its financial trouble.

Cultural Leonesa B was refounded in 2014, recovering its original name "Jupiter Leonés". It started playing in Segunda Provincial, seventh tier, and it finished its first season as champion of the league and promoting.

With the entering of the Qatari Aspire Academy in the board of Cultural Leonesa, the intention was to promote Júpiter to Tercera División immediately. In its first season managing the club, Júpiter achieves promotion to Regional Aficionados, only one tier below Tercera División, and two years later, in the season 2017-201,8 Jupiter reached the goal promoting to Tercera División (the fourth tier in Spain's football leagues system).

Club names

Season to season

43 seasons in Tercera División
1 season in Tercera División RFEF

Current squad

References

External links
Official website 

Football clubs in Castile and León
Association football clubs established in 1929
Association football clubs disestablished in 2010
 
Spanish reserve football teams
1929 establishments in Spain
2010 disestablishments in Spain
Sport in León, Spain